Andrews High School may refer to:

In the United States 
Andrews High School (North Carolina), Andrews, North Carolina
Andrews High School (South Carolina), Andrews, South Carolina
Andrews High School (Texas), Andrews, Texas
T. Wingate Andrews High School, High Point, North Carolina

In India 
 Andrew's High (H.S.) School, Kolkata